The 15th Academy Awards was held in the Cocoanut Grove at The Ambassador Hotel in Los Angeles on March 4, 1943, honoring the films of 1942. The ceremony is most famous for the speech by Greer Garson; accepting the award for Best Actress, Garson spoke for nearly 6 minutes, considered to be the longest Oscars acceptance speech.

Mrs. Miniver was the second film (after My Man Godfrey in 1936) to receive nominations in all four acting categories, as well as the first film to receive five acting nominations. It won six of its twelve nominations, including Best Picture, and William Wyler's first of three Best Director awards.

Irving Berlin presented the Academy Award for Best Original Song, which he ended up winning himself for "White Christmas". There was a four-way tie for Best Documentary Feature, a unique occurrence.

A portion of the ceremony was broadcast by CBS Radio.

Awards

Nominees announced on February 8, 1943. Winners are listed first and highlighted in boldface.

Academy Honorary Award
Charles Boyer – "for his progressive cultural achievement in establishing the French Research Foundation in Los Angeles as a source of reference for the Hollywood Motion Picture Industry".
Noël Coward – "for his outstanding production achievement in In Which We Serve".
Metro-Goldwyn-Mayer – "for its achievement in representing the American Way of Life in the production of the Andy Hardy series of films".

Irving G. Thalberg Memorial Award
Sidney Franklin

Multiple nominations and awards

The following 30 films received multiple nominations:
 12 nominations: Mrs. Miniver
 11 nominations: The Pride of the Yankees
 8 nominations: Yankee Doodle Dandy
 7 nominations: Random Harvest and The Talk of the Town
 4 nominations: Arabian Nights, Jungle Book, The Magnificent Ambersons, This Above All, and Wake Island
 3 nominations: Bambi; The Black Swan; Flying Tigers; 49th Parallel; Holiday Inn; Kings Row; Now, Voyager; The Pied Piper; Reap the Wild Wind; Take a Letter, Darling; and You Were Never Lovelier
 2 nominations: Captains of the Clouds, Flying with Music, The Gold Rush, My Gal Sal, One of Our Aircraft Is Missing, Road to Morocco, The Shanghai Gesture, Silver Queen, and Woman of the Year

The following two films received multiple awards:
 6 wins: Mrs. Miniver
 3 wins: Yankee Doodle Dandy

See also
1942 in film

References

Academy Awards ceremonies
1942 film awards
1943 in Los Angeles
1943 in American cinema
CBS Radio programs
March 1943 events